The Battle of Kuhmo was a series of skirmishes, mainly between January 28 and March 13, 1940, near the town of Kuhmo during the Soviet-Finnish Winter War. The 54th Soviet Rifle Division was encircled, but was able to hold out until the end of the war.

Prelude   
By conquering Northern Finland, the Soviet leadership wanted to occupy the entire Finnish state and cut off the traffic routes to its neighbors during the war. In order to support the advance of the 163rd Rifle Division and 44th Motorized Rifle Division on Oulu, the 54th Rifle Division was to advance south to cut off any routes for reinforcements from the Finnish heartland.

Battle 
After crossing the border, the 54th Division advanced towards Kuhmo. The Finnish army had only small border units stationed in this area, as an attack in northern Finland was not expected. On December 3, 1939, the Finnish High Command under Mannerheim was forced to send a regiment from the reserve, to slow down the advance of the Soviet division. By New Year 1940, the Soviet units had moved within 15 kilometers of the village. There, the division was largely spared of attacks by the outnumbered enemy. The commander of the division, General Nikolai Gusevsky, used this pause to fortify his positions and even had a makeshift airfield built on a frozen lake. The division was in the form of an elongated column along the approach road to Kuhmo.

After the 163rd and 44th Soviet divisions had been defeated at the Battle of Suomussalmi further north, Mannerheim sent the units from Suomussalmi towards Kuhmo. The 9th Division under Hjalmar Siilasvuo reached Kuhmo but was outnumbered by the Soviet division and it was now lacking ammunition and artillery. Anyhow, on January 28, 1940, the Finnish troops launched a counterattack. The Finns, who operated on skis from the forest like they did at Suomussalmi, succeeded in cutting off the Soviet division and dividing it into three parts, so-called mottis. The Finns used captured Soviet anti-tank guns in Suomussalmi to repel enemy counter-attacks with tanks. A stalemate loomed.

The Soviets tried to relieve the surrounded units with a newly formed 1,800-man ski brigade and the deployment of the 23rd Rifle Division, but these attempts failed. The 54th Division was adequately supplied by the Soviet Air Force so that it was able to maintain its resistance until the armistice on March 13, 1940.

Consequences 
Finnish casualties were 1,340 dead, 3,123 wounded and 132 missing. The Soviet casualties were 2,118 dead, 3,732 wounded and 573 missing. The bodies of 720 Soviet soldiers were found in the area where Colonel Dolin's ski brigade had fought.

The assessment of the result of the battle is double: the Finns managed to block the Soviet advance, but their hope of being able to quickly repeat the success of the Battle of Suomussalmi and that of the Raate road, in order to then be able to transfer the 9th division to the crucial sector of the Isthmus of Karelia, was thwarted by the strenuous Soviet resistance.

See also 

 List of Finnish military equipment of World War II
 List of Soviet Union military equipment of World War II

References 

1940 in Finland
Kuhmo
Kuhmo
January 1940 events
February 1940 events
March 1940 events